Alessandro Marchetti (born 13 May 1988) is an Italian professional footballer who plays as a defender for Serie D club Bra.

Career
Born in Livorno, Marchetti started his career with Livorno. His first and last involvement in the first team was after being named on the bench for Livorno's game against Palermo on 26 April 2006, which finished 3–1 in favour of Livorno. During the next 2006–07 season, he made his senior debut with Casale Calcio in Serie D.

In 2007 Marchetti joined Carrarese Calcio. For two seasons, he earned 24 appearances in the fourth division. In 2009 Marchetti signed for Legnano. On 15 November 2009, he scored his first goal in his career, in a 1–1 draw against Crociati Noceto. At the end of the 2009–10 season, Alessandro returned to Carrarese Calcio.

In January 2011, Marchetti joined Lucchese 1905. On 6 February, he made his Lucchese and third division debut in a 4–2 away win over Cosenza Calcio. Marchetti netted Lucchese's only goal in a 2–1 defeat at Benevento Calcio on 27 March.

In August 2012, Marchetti joined Bulgarian side Botev Vratsa. He made his league debut in a 1–0 away win over Minyor Pernik on 30 September, coming on as a substitute. On 22 May 2013, Marchetti scored his first goal in the Bulgarian A Group against Montana.

References

External links
 Career summary by aic.football.it
 
 

1988 births
Living people
Italian footballers
Association football fullbacks
Association football midfielders
Carrarese Calcio players
A.C. Legnano players
S.S.D. Lucchese 1905 players
U.S. Alessandria Calcio 1912 players
FC Botev Vratsa players
Savona F.B.C. players
FC Alashkert players
A.C. Tuttocuoio 1957 San Miniato players
S.S.D. Sanremese Calcio players
Forlì F.C. players
A.C.R. Messina players
A.S.D. Giarre Calcio 1946 players
A.C. Bra players
Serie C players
Serie D players
First Professional Football League (Bulgaria) players
Armenian Premier League players
Italian expatriate footballers
Italian expatriate sportspeople in Bulgaria
Expatriate footballers in Bulgaria
Expatriate footballers in Armenia